Fashad Mohamed ( fashadun muhamad) is an Iraqi who died in custody on April 5, 2004.
He is alleged to have been captured, and beaten by SEAL team 7.
He was hooded, sleep deprived, and soaked with extremely hot and cold water. When he was finally allowed to sleep he did not wake up.

References

External links
 Human Rights First; Command’s Responsibility: Detainee Deaths in U.S. Custody in Iraq and Afghanistan

Year of birth missing
2004 deaths
Extrajudicial prisoners killed while in United States custody
Iraqi extrajudicial prisoners of the United States
Iraqi people who died in prison custody
Deaths by beating